Marian University is a private Roman Catholic university in Indianapolis, Indiana. Founded in 1851 by the Sisters of St. Francis in Oldenburg, Indiana, the college moved to Indianapolis in 1937. Marian was referred to as Marian College from 1936 until 2009, when it was renamed Marian University. 

In 2013, the university opened the first medical school in over 100 years in Indiana, which was the first osteopathic medical school in the state and the second operational medical school in Indiana at the time. As of 2017, enrollment included 2,431 undergraduate students, 1,164 graduate students, and 650 doctoral students.

Marian University athletes have won 45 USA Cycling National Championships and 8 NAIA National Championships: Football in 2012 and 2015; Women's Basketball in 2016 and 2017; Men's Track and Field 60-meter hurdles in 2016 and 2017, and 110-meter hurdles and 800 meter in 2017. Their mascot is Knightro the Knight.

History

Marian University was founded in 1851 by the Sisters of St. Francis, Oldenburg, Indiana, as a liberal arts school with a program for training teachers. Under the direction of Father Francis Joseph Rudolph and Mother Theresa Hackelmeier, teachers were trained at Oldenburg for more than a decade before Indiana adopted its first tax-supported normal school.

Originally known as St. Francis Normal, the school became a four-year, state-approved institution which merged with 'Immaculate Conception Junior College to form Marian College. In November 1936, the Sisters of St. Francis purchased the former James A. Allison estate, "Riverdale", located in Indianapolis, as a site for Marian College.

In 1937, the institution moved to Indianapolis under the direction of Mother M. Clarissa Dillhoff, after securing a state charter and purchasing the Riverdale estate in 1936. Allison Mansion became the new location of Marian College. The building housed the library, administrative offices, classrooms, and sleeping quarters for the Sisters. Classes began on September 15, 1937.

In 1948 the institution began an expansion project that included the addition of Clare Hall, the Gymnasium, and Marian Hall. In 1954, as the new Marian Hall was completed, the institution became the first co-educational Catholic college in Indiana. Two years later, the North Central Association accredited Marian College.

The university's Modernist-style library was designed by noted Indianapolis architect Evans Woollen III, the principal and founder of Woollen, Molzan and Partners, and completed in 1966. The library's square form has an exposed structural frame and open staircase with stacks arranged around reading areas.

The National Council for Accreditation of Teacher Education formally accepted all teacher education programs of the college in 1976. The Indiana State Board of Nursing approved the associate level nursing curriculum in 1977 and the baccalaureate program in 1987. The National League of Nursing has accredited both programs—the associate in 1986 and the baccalaureate in 1992. In 2000, Marian's Adult Programs (MAP) began offering bachelor's and associate degrees in business.

On July 1, 2009, Marian College became Marian University. Over the course of several years prior to this, the college grew and expanded the academic curriculum, added a football team and marching band, adding and renovating buildings.

On January 15, 2010, Marian University announced plans to begin a college of osteopathic medicine; the second in the state of Indiana and the first Catholic osteopathic medical school due to the generosity of an anonymous donor's $30 million pledge. On August 23, 2011, during the groundbreaking ceremony, the new school of osteopathic medicine building was officially named after the erstwhile anonymous donor, AIT Labs CEO Michael A. Evans. Additionally, Margaret Mary Community Hospital pledged $150,000 to the College of Osteopathic Medicine dedicated to building a simulation lab and seminar room for the medical students.

In July 2021, Ancilla College and Marian officially merged and opened as the Marian University's Ancilla College in Donaldson, Indiana.

Campus
Marian University is located about four miles northwest of downtown Indianapolis, on a 200-acre campus. The Marian University campus includes: 
 The Nina Mason Pulliam EcoLab, a 55-acre wetland and lowland forest located on the north end of the Marian University campus.
 The Riverdale Estate, which includes Allison Mansion and Indiana's largest and most intact landscape designed by Jens Jensen. The mansion holds the offices of the president.
 The Lake Sullivan Sports Complex, now known as the Indy Cycloplex, which Marian operates for the City of Indianapolis Parks and Recreation Department. This park is home to the Major Taylor Velodrome and Indy Cycloplex BMX track, as well as singletrack MTB trails and a dual slalom course, and hosts races, clinics, and other events in all cycling disciplines, as well as community events.

Academics
As of 2017, Marian University served 2,431 undergraduate students, 1,164 graduate students, and 650 medical students with a student-faculty ratio of 14:1. Marian University is accredited by North Central Association of Colleges and Schools.

Marian University is organized into five schools with 40 majors, 46 minors, and 26 concentrations:
 Clark H. Byrum School of Business
 College of Osteopathic Medicine
 College of Arts and Sciences
 The Educators College
 Alan and Sue Leighton School of Nursing

Marian University offers several routes to earning a teaching license via Indianapolis Teaching Fellows, traditional education program, Master's Bridge to Teaching, the Master of Arts in Teaching program, and the ACTION program. Marian University is one of the few universities to offer the Leadership Academy for Principals.

Marian University Leighton School of Nursing offers several degree programs including an online Accelerated BSN program that can be completed in as few as 16 months.

Marian University College of Osteopathic Medicine opened in August 2013 with the first-class graduated 133 doctors of osteopathic medicine.
The university also offers accelerated degree programs in business for adults through Marian's Adult Programs (MAP). 

On the Ancilla College campus, there are currently 7 degree programs offered. These include a Bachelor's in Nursing as well as Associate's in Agriculture, Business, Education, Exercise Science, Liberal Arts, and Veterinary Nursing.

Student life
The Student Government Association of Marian University (SGA) is actively involved with campus events such as homecoming and the fall festival. Intramural sports are popular, especially basketball, flag football, and ultimate frisbee. Construction of a new dining commons, fitness facility, and the Paul J. Norman Center, the new home of the Byrum School of Business, will be completed in 2018. Students perform plays and other theatrical performances, including a marching band and speech team. In 2010, the speech team won the state championship and placed tenth in Division I at the national forensics championship. Each year, the speech team travels to nearly 12 tournaments, plus a week-long trip to the National Forensic Association's Individual Events Tournament in April. At tournaments, students compete in a variety of events such as impromptu speaking, persuasive speaking, and dramatic interpretation. On February 20, 2010, the speech team claimed first place over-all at the state tournament. A member of the speech team that year went on to become Miss. Indiana in 2014.

There are nearly 30 student run clubs and organizations at Marian University, including The Literary Arts Society (LASMU), College Mentors for Kids, Pax Christi (peace and justice), Society of Human Resource Management (business), Marian University Student Nurses’ Association (MUSNA) (nursing), Kappa Delta Pi, Japan and Anime Culture Club (JACC)(culture), Marian Urban Sports (MUSC), the Green Life club (general), and Alpha Delta Gamma, the university's first fraternity.

Adjacent to campus, though not located on campus property, is Bishop Simon Bruté College Seminary, a college seminary for Catholic seminarians, operated by the Archdiocese of Indianapolis. Approximately 20-30 young men, who are also Marian students, live at the seminary and receive formation there.

Athletics
The Marian athletic teams are called the Knights. The university is a member of the National Association of Intercollegiate Athletics (NAIA), primarily competing in the Crossroads League (formerly known as the Mid-Central College Conference (MCCC) until after the 2011–12 school year) for most of its sports since the 1987–88 academic year; while its football team competes in the Mideast League of the Mid-States Football Association (MSFA).

Marian competes in 24 intercollegiate varsity sports: Men's sports include baseball, basketball, bowling, cross country, football, golf, rugby, soccer, tennis, track & field and wrestling; while women's sports include basketball, bowling, cross country, golf, lacrosse, soccer, softball, tennis, track & field and volleyball; and co-ed sports include cycling, cheerleading and dance.

The university's mascot is Knightro, the Knight.

Cycling
Marian University is nationally known for its cycling team, which practices and competes at the Indy Cycloplex, home of the Major Taylor Velodrome. The cycling team is a Division I varsity team underneath the collegiate cycling umbrella of USA Cycling.

Marian University's cycling team has won 19 national track championships in Division I and is widely regarded as one of the most prestigious programs in the nation. In the 2009–10 seasons, Marian University won both USA Cycling's Collegiate Track National Championships in 2009 and USA Cycling's Collegiate Road Championship title in 2010. The cycling team has won a total of 47 national championship titles in the track, mountain bike, cyclo-cross, BMX, and road disciplines.

National Championship appearances

Men's basketball
The men's basketball program is the oldest intercollegiate athletic team at Marian. Established for the 1954–1955 season by athletic director and Head Coach Walt Fields, the team has an overall record of 868-740 (.539). A Crossroads League member since 1988–1989, the Knights have a 225-209 (.518) conference record, winning three titles (1988–89, 2000–01, 2003–04) and two Crossroads League Tournament titles (1997–98, 2000–01).

The Knights have seven NAIA Tournament appearances and have a post-season record of 10-7 (.588). They reached the Final Four in 2018-19 and have two additional Elite Eight berths (2000–01, 2017–18) and three additional Sweet Sixteen appearances (2003–04, 2011–12 and 2019–20).

John Grimes led the program for 36 seasons, compiling a record of 566-408 (.581), three Crossroads League titles and three NAIA Tournament appearances (1997–1998, 2000–2001 and 2003–2004). Grimes also served as the athletic director for the first 26 seasons of his coaching tenure. Todd Lickliter led the program for three seasons (2012–2013 to 2014–2015).

Football
Marian began a football program in 2007 under head coach Ted Karras Jr. Since then, the Knights have won two NAIA national championships. In 2012, in only their sixth year of play, the Knights won their first NAIA football championship. In 2014, the #7 Marian Knights became the NAIA runner-up after losing to #8 Southern Oregon University 55–31. The next year, the Knights won the NAIA championship, a rematch of the 2014 national championship against the SOU Raiders, 31–14. This marked their third championship game appearance and second victory in four years. The head coach for that victory was Mark Henninger. Several football program alumni have earned contracts at the professional level, such as Krishawn Hogan and Julian Williams.

In 2019, Marian running back Charles Salary was named the NAIA Football National Player of the Year, the first time a player from Marian was recognized with the honor.

Season-by-season record

Other athletic achievements
Other Knights' athletic achievements include:

 23 All-Conference selections
 309 All MCC First Team Honors
 162 Daktronics NAIA Scholar-Athletes
 25 NAIA All Americans
 5 NAIA Champions of Character Award recipients
 1 NAIA Football National Player of the Year
 6 NAIA Region VIII Player of the Year
 1 NAIA Region VIII Player of the Year
 37 MCC championships
 25 MCC Coach of the Year Honors
 14 MCC Players of the Year
 38 USA Cycling Collegiate National Championships

See also
The Indiana College Mathematics Competition
Indianapolis Art Center provides educational programming for Marian University

References

External links
 
 Official athletics website

 
Franciscan universities and colleges
Liberal arts colleges in Indiana
Catholic universities and colleges in Indiana
Universities and colleges in Indianapolis
Association of Catholic Colleges and Universities
1851 establishments in Indiana
1936 establishments in Indiana
Educational institutions established in 1851
Educational institutions established in 1936
Roman Catholic Archdiocese of Indianapolis